Legrandia is a genus of the plant family Myrtaceae, first described as a genus in 1944. It contains only one known species, Legrandia concinna, endemic to the Republic of Chile in South America.

References

Myrtaceae
Monotypic Myrtaceae genera
Endemic flora of Chile